Pincers are a hand tool used in many situations where a mechanical advantage is required to pinch, cut or pull an object. Pincers are first-class levers, but differ from pliers in that the concentration of force is either to a point, or to an edge perpendicular to the length of the tool. This allows pincers to be brought close to a surface, which is often required when working with nails.

Pincers are primarily used for removing objects (typically nails) out of a material that they have been previously applied to. Carpenter's pincers are particularly suited to these tasks.

If the pincers have perpendicular cutting edges, the pincers are often called end-nippers or end-cutters.

Pincers, often red-hot, have also been used as an instrument of torture since ancient Roman times or earlier.

Pliers are a similar tool with a different type of head used for squeezing, rather than cutting and pulling.

See also
 Chela (organ)
 Pincer (biology)

References 

Cutting tools
Pliers

pt:Turquesa (ferramenta)